"" ("Our Burundi") is the national anthem of Burundi. Written in the Kirundi language by a group of writers led by Jean-Baptiste Ntahokaja, a Catholic priest, and composed by Marc Barengayabo, it was adopted upon independence in 1962.

Lyrics

Notes

References

External links
Burundi: Burundi Bwacu - Audio of the national anthem of Burundi, with information and lyrics (archive link)
Burundi Bwacu
Vocal

African anthems
Burundian music
National symbols of Burundi
National anthem compositions in A-flat major